State Road 208 (NM 208) is a  state highway in the US state of New Mexico. NM 208's southern terminus is at U.S. Route 62 (US 62) and US 180 west of Hobbs, and the northern terminus is at NM 18 northwest of Hobbs.

Major intersections

See also

References

External links

208
Transportation in Lea County, New Mexico